Narseh (also Romanized as Nerseh; also known as Narsen) is a village in Kuhsarat Rural District, in the Central District of Minudasht County, Golestan Province, Iran. At the 2006 census, its population was 82, in 22 families.

References 

Populated places in Minudasht County